James Gregory Keelor,  (born Francis McIntyre, August 29, 1954) is a Canadian singer-songwriter and musician. He is best known as a member of the band Blue Rodeo, where he shares song writing and vocal duties with Jim Cuddy. Keelor has also released three solo albums and appeared as a guest musician on albums by Crash Vegas and Melissa McClelland. He participated, along with Rick White and members of The Sadies, in the supergroup The Unintended.

Early life
Keelor was born Francis McIntyre in Inverness, Nova Scotia, on August 29, 1954. Though he didn't know until adulthood, his birth parents had put him up for adoption. Keelor was adopted at age three and raised in Montréal.

Keelor attended North Toronto Collegiate Institute, and it was there that he befriended football teammate Jim Cuddy in 1971. After graduation, Keelor, Cuddy and a group of college friends, in search of adventure, traveled to Western Canada in a rundown old school bus. The bus broke down in Saskatchewan, and Keelor somehow or another ended up in Lake Louise where he worked for a time. It was in Lake Louise that he learned to play the guitar and first considered a career as a musician.

Career 
Keelor has been friends with Jim Cuddy since both attended North Toronto Collegiate Institute high school. When they both had finished university, they decided to form a band which they called the Hi-Fi's, along with Jim Sublett on drums and Malcolm Schell playing bass. The band released a single in 1980 featuring "I Don't Know Why (You Love Me)" and on the B side "Look What You've Done". The record was not a big commercial success, though, and when they couldn't get a record deal in Toronto, they headed off to New York City. A while after returning to Toronto from New York, Keelor and Cuddy formed Blue Rodeo.

Keelor is also a producer, having co-produced Blue Rodeo's Lost Together and solo-producing Cuff the Duke's albums Way Down Here and Morning Comes.

Keelor also composed an original soundtrack for the 2010 Canadian Western comedy Gunless.

In 2000, Keelor and Blue Rodeo bandmate Jim Cuddy were the recipients of the National Achievement Award at the annual SOCAN Awards held in Toronto.

In 2013, he was made an Officer of the Order of Canada along with Jim Cuddy, "for their contributions to Canadian music and for their support of various charitable causes".

In 2018, he contributed the song "Unprovable" to the compilation album The Al Purdy Songbook.

Discography

Albums

Singles

Music videos

Producer

References

External links
 Greg Keelor official website

 
 Entry at canadianbands.com
 Entry at thecanadianencyclopedia.ca

1954 births
Living people
Canadian rock singers
Canadian country singer-songwriters
Canadian male singer-songwriters
Canadian rock guitarists
Canadian country guitarists
Canadian male guitarists
Musicians from Nova Scotia
Officers of the Order of Canada
People from Inverness County, Nova Scotia
Canadian country rock musicians
Canadian record producers
Crash Vegas members
Blue Rodeo members
20th-century Canadian male singers
21st-century Canadian male singers
20th-century Canadian guitarists
21st-century Canadian guitarists